The Radwell Manor Railway was a  gauge miniature railway situated in the village of Radwell, near Felmersham, in North Bedfordshire, England. It was built by Mr. H. W. Franklin, who was closely associated with the Bassett-Lowke company of Northampton, and whose products were often tested on its  of track. The privately run railway opened in 1920, and ceased operating with the onset of the Second World War, around 1939. However, much of the railway remained intact until at least the early 1960s because it was seen in approximately 1960-1962 by a young railway enthusiast who was exploring the area.

Layout

According to Wenman Joseph Bassett-Lowke, the RMR had a length of "all but , and among its attractions are an up-to-date station, a tunnel, viaducts, embankments and cuttings ... and several over-bridges, together with a complete system of signalling."

Other features included sidings, engine and carriage sheds, a water tower and a turntable.

Steam locomotives

Loadstone

An adaptation of a Raven design of three-cylinder Atlantic, as ran on the North Eastern Railway.

Highland Mary

A 4-4-0 design.

See also

 For other  miniature railways, see Ridable miniature railway.

Sources

 
 
 
 

Miniature railways in the United Kingdom
10¼ in gauge railways in England